The Athlete may refer to:
 The Athlete (1932 film), a 1932 short animated film, part of the Pooch the Pup series
 The Athlete (2009 film), a 2009 film portraying the life of Ethiopian marathon-runner Abebe Bikila

See also
Athlete (disambiguation)
The Athletic, sports website